Ryan Kavanaugh (born December 4, 1974) is an American film financier. He co-founded and served as CEO of Relativity Media, where he brokered deals between Wall Street investors and major film studios. He credited his risk-assessment algorithm with Relativity Media's initial success. After Relativity Media filed for bankruptcy, he stepped down as CEO and faced several lawsuits regarding his management. He later founded Proxima Media, which held a controlling stake in Triller from 2019 to 2022.

Early life
Kavanaugh was born to a Jewish family in Los Angeles, California, where he was raised in the Brentwood neighborhood and attended Brentwood High School. His mother is a real estate broker and his father is a dentist turned businessman, born in Germany. His father changed his surname to Kavanaugh before his son's birth. Kavanaugh began purchasing stock shares when he was six years old.

Kavanaugh attended UC Santa Barbara and UCLA but dropped out in 1996. In 2012, Kavanaugh threatened The New Yorker with legal action for its reporting on him, including its report that he dropped out of university. Kavanaugh said he was "an official graduate of UCLA and currently enrolled in a PhD program at USC". The New Yorker stood by its reporting. While subsequent sources reported that Kavanaugh finished a degree in 2012, The Wall Street Journal reported that there was no record of him taking classes at USC.

Career

Early career
After leaving UCLA in the late 1990s, Kavanaugh started a short-lived venture capital firm. Kavanaugh's uncle connected the family with producer Jon Peters. Kavanaugh and his father leveraged Peters's Hollywood connections to raise an estimated US$175 million in investment funds for the younger Kavanaugh's company.

In the early 2000s, when investors began asking for their money, Kavanaugh became difficult to reach. Several investors, including Peters, sued Kavanaugh, alleging fraud, and the suits were settled out of court. Michael Sitrick, an executive and Kavanaugh family friend, also sued, alleging that Kavanaugh violated terms of their agreement and placed most of Sitrick's $6 million investment into a type of Ponzi scheme at a company where Kavanaugh was a board member. An arbitrator found that Kavanaugh was "clearly negligent", and Sitrick won a $7.7 million arbitration judgment against Kavanaugh. He never received payment because Kavanaugh successfully argued that he was virtually penniless and his business on the verge of bankruptcy at the time of the judgment.

Relativity Media

Pre-bankruptcy

Kavanaugh co-founded Relativity Media in 2003 or 2004 with entertainment executive Lynwood Spinks. Spinks's relationship with Warner Bros. gave Kavanaugh the opportunity to broker a deal between a hedge fund and Warner Bros.' film studio. In the early 2000s, Wall Street investors were awash in cash and looking for investments outside of the stock market. Relativity Media brokered "film slate" deals between these investors and studios including Universal Pictures, Marvel Entertainment, and Sony Pictures, earning fees of $500,000 to $1 million per film. In addition to fees, Kavanaugh also insisted on being credited as an executive producer in each film. This gave Relativity Media the aura of a film production company and Kavanaugh a reputation as a producer—without having creative involvement—in nearly 100 movies.

At Relativity Media, Kavanaugh created a Monte Carlo-based model that used certain variables to predict the probability of a given film's commercial success. Kavanaugh held Albert Einstein as his hero and would write long equations on whiteboards at investor meetings. Although Kavanaugh frequently cited the model's accuracy rate to be 85%, a source close to Elliott Associates, one of the company's principal (and earliest) lenders, estimated it to be much lower. Some investment banks and industry executives also cast doubt on the model's efficacy.

Kavanaugh advertised heavily in trade press, where he was praised for Relativity Media's high-value deals. He garnered a reputation for successfully bridging Wall Street with the risk-prone film production industry. By 2009, three quarters of films produced by Sony and Universal Pictures had used Kavanaugh's financing. In 2010, Kavanaugh raised investor funds for Relativity Media to launch its own studio, producing movies vetted by Kavanaugh's algorithm. Although Relativity Media executives privately disagreed with Kavanaugh's estimations, he publicized increasingly grandiose claims about Relativity Media's valuation, combining third-party investment deals and optimistic projections into reported revenue. By the early 2010s, the algorithm ultimately proved unprofitable, with box-office bombs overwhelming few commercial successes.

In May 2011, Elliott Associates attempted to rein in Kavanaugh's management. Kavanaugh publicly claimed that he would buy out the hedge fund's stake to re-take charge of his company, but Elliott Associates denied that they would sell to him. Their primary investment in Relativity Media funded a Universal Pictures deal, but Kavanaugh's studio chose to date several of its own films in competition with Universal's. Elliott Associates moved to take direct control of their film deal, eliminating Kavanaugh's executive producer fees, and significantly dropping their stake in Relativity Media.

In November 2011, when Relativity Media was desperately short on funds, investor Ron Burkle arranged a series of loans to Kavanaugh's company in exchange for interest. Industry speculation surfaced that Burkle would oust Kavanaugh from Relativity Media in favor of his friend Harvey Weinstein, but Burkle and Weinstein both disclaimed the scenario. Relativity Media executives became increasingly doubtful as the company's financial health declined yet Kavanaugh's valuations kept increasing. Kavanaugh presented implausible valuations and "adjusted" EBITDA numbers to investors, which included projections based on films the company had already relinquished to Elliott Management. In June 2015, lenders began requiring Kavanaugh to receive approval before making any transactions. In July, Relativity Media filed for bankruptcy. As a result, Netflix sought to end a distribution deal with Relativity Media, and Kavanaugh responded by sending threatening emails to Ted Sarandos, co-CEO of Netflix.

Post-bankruptcy
Shortly after the bankruptcy filing, RKA Film Financing, then one of its lenders, sued the company for misappropriating marketing funds, called Kavanaugh a "con man", and alleged that he was operating a "scheme to defraud investors". They also alleged that Kavanaugh used their invested funds for personal expenses. Relativity Media denied that the money was diverted, saying that RKA Film Financing understood that the money would go into a general corporate account. Relativity Media countersued for $200 million. Kavanaugh and other defendants filed a motion to dismiss, arguing RKA Film Financing failed to state a claim, and the suit was dismissed with prejudice.

Relativity Media's operations and reorganization remained under the supervision of a bankruptcy court until March 2016. Kavanaugh eventually stepped down as CEO at the end of 2016 but held onto a majority equity of Relativity Media. Leading up to his resignation, Kavanaugh was absent from the company's offices for weeks and did not take part in executive decisions.

In May 2018, Relativity Media filed for bankruptcy again and arranged to sell all of its assets. The United States Trustee's office argued that the bankruptcy seemed to benefit Kavanaugh and the new buyer UltraV Holdings at the expense of Relativity Media's creditors. The trustee learned that Kavanaugh paid himself $2.6 million between April and November 2016 while his company failed to pay bankruptcy fees or file tax returns. They also questioned the legitimacy of Relativity Media's sale to UltraV Holdings since Kavanaugh continued to have extensive access at the company after the bankruptcy filing stated that he had already left. UltraV Holdings quickly rehired Kavanaugh as a consultant for Relativity Media, paying him $10,000 per month.

In June 2018, an arbitration case found that Relativity Media executives fabricated a memo accusing Relativity Media's former co-president Adam Fields of sexual harassment. A forensic audit of Relativity Media found the memo had been generated by a user named "kav kav". Relativity Media submitted the falsified memo to court two weeks before Fields's wrongful termination suit against Kavanaugh was set to be tried. Fields's lawsuit alleged that Kavanaugh misrepresented Relativity Media's financial prospects, wrongfully fired Fields four months into his four-year contract, and used Relativity Media office space to produce pornography without the co-president's knowledge or authorization. A Los Angeles arbitration judge awarded Fields $8.4 million in damages and found that Kavanaugh "must be" one of the people who forged the sexual harassment memo.

Proxima Media
In 2017, Kavanaugh launched film production company Proxima Media. In 2019, Kavanaugh announced a prospective partnership which would provide $250 million to Proxima Media for film production. However, the potential Hong Kong-based partner announced the deal differently, saying that Proxima Media would pay $100 million for a stake in their production company. Film industry peers and The Hollywood Reporter cast doubt on Kavanaugh's version of the announcement, citing the escalating trade war between the US and China and the unhealthy financial situation of the Hong Kong production company.

After unsuccessfully attempting to acquire the online stock trading game Hollywood Stock Exchange (HSX) in February 2019, Kavanaugh set out to create a film properties trading exchange for fans to invest in movies. In May 2019, Kavanaugh announced a cryptocurrency to be used for fractional investing in the platform's slates. Kavanaugh was confident that the Jobs Act would allow his platform to operate legally, but securities experts said that the project's inherent risks might increase scrutiny from the SEC. He tapped Elon Spar, who formerly worked for Cantor Fitzgerald, the owner of HSX, to help him develop the company. The two subsequently formed Entertainment Stock X (ESX) with Spar as CEO.

In June 2019, Spar initiated a lawsuit against Kavanaugh for fraud. He argued that Kavanaugh persuaded him to go into business under false pretenses. According to the suit, Kavanaugh had claimed to have hundreds of millions of dollars in capital, but Spar discovered that the company had virtually none. Spar further accused Kavanaugh of running a Ponzi scheme at ESX by redirecting investors' funds to pay old debts, manipulating corporate records to conceal his fraud, as well as diverting corporate funds for his own personal use rather than paying employees and contractors. Kavanaugh submitted a counterclaim alleging Spar was breaching his contract with ESX. After settling outside of court, Kavanaugh and Spar withdrew their complaints before the court filing process was completed. Spar then released a public statement saying his earlier characterization of the company was inaccurate.

In 2019, Proxima Media acquired a majority stake in the video-sharing platform Triller, coinciding with the Trump administration's announcement that it intended to ban its more popular Chinese competitor TikTok in the US. Kavanaugh subsequently co-founded Triller Fight Club, a subsidiary focusing on pay-per-view boxing events.  In 2021, Kavanaugh proposed a potential merger with SeaChange International to take Triller public. SeaChange International's filing with the SEC stated that a dog food company controlled by Kavanaugh sponsored three Triller fights and represented about 74% of Triller's accounts receivable in 2021. Triller's attorney disputed the revenue data in the filing, but the merger was later dissolved. As of October 2022, Proxima Media no longer owned a controlling share in Triller, and Kavanaugh was no longer a board member.

Films produced

As of 2012, Kavanaugh has been involved to some capacity in either production or financing for over 200 films, including The Fighter, Limitless, Hancock, Mamma Mia!, The Social Network, Salt, and Cowboys & Aliens. Kavanaugh was denied a producing credit for the Academy Award nomination of the film The Fighter since the Academy of Motion Picture Arts and Sciences only allows the submission of up to three producers for Academy Award consideration; Kavanaugh unsuccessfully appealed the Academy's decision. Despite creating and using an algorithm likened to a moneyball approach, Kavanaugh turned down a chance to invest in the movie Moneyball, citing his model's prediction that sports movies are often commercial failures. The film went on to become a commercial success.

Philanthropy
According to former Relativity Media executives, Kavanaugh often pledged large charitable gifts and then billed them to the company. In 2007, Kavanaugh presented Habitat for Humanity with an oversized check pledging $1 million and announced he would become a fund-raising chair for the charity. However, as of 2015, Kavanaugh had not yet donated the promised funds. In 2010, the Board of Governors at Cedars-Sinai Medical Center awarded Kavanaugh its Hollywood Humanitarian Award. In 2011, he received the Anti-Defamation League's Distinguished Entertainment Industry Award. Kavanaugh served as chairman of the board of The Art of Elysium from 2009 until 2015.

Personal life
In 2011, Kavanaugh married ballet dancer Britta Lazenga. In 2015, he married model Jessica Roffey. He has two children. He is a member of the Wilshire Boulevard Temple. According to Forbes, while having been previously featured on their billionaires list in 2013, Kavanaugh's net worth fell below $1 billion once Relativity Media filed for bankruptcy in 2015. As of 2020, Kavanaugh had been a regular donor to the Republican Party. After 47 years of living in Los Angeles, California, Kavanaugh expressed his intention to move both his residence and business to Florida due to LA's progressive governance, rising crime and homelessness, and California's perceived anti-business policies.

Controversies
Kavanaugh frequently used a personal helicopter for daily commuting. The resulting disturbance prompted some of his neighbors to submit complaints to state and local officials. When it was revealed that the hotel Kavanaugh used for landing was legally permitted only for emergency landings, a spokesperson for Kavanaugh expressed his intention to stop landing there.

In 2012, Kavanaugh was targeted by an extensive extortion plot that was mainly aimed at business executives, including Harvey Weinstein. The perpetrator sent a letter to Kavanaugh demanding $11.3 million and threatening the lives of his family members. A day after receiving the letter, actor Vivek Shah, who had been photographed with Kavanaugh at an event in 2011, was arrested on extortion charges and eventually convicted to seven years in prison.

In 2014, an email thread obtained through the Sony Pictures hack was published, in which Kavanaugh decries the US government's handling of the Gaza–Israel conflict. Among the recipients was Natalie Portman who described the thread as "very disturbing" and complained to Kavanaugh that she did not consent to have her private email address included in the mailing list and wished to be removed. Kavanaugh responded, "Sorry, You are right jews being slaughtered [...] is much much less important then  your email address being shared with 20 of our peers" and continued to include her in the mailing list.

Legal issues
In 2006, Kavanaugh was arrested after being accused of driving under the influence of alcohol (DUI) and being involved in a hit-and-run. All but the DUI charge, which was lessened to a wet reckless charge, were dropped. Kavanaugh was placed on three years of probation, ordered to pay a fine and take counseling and alcohol education programs. While on probation for his earlier DUI arrest, Kavanaugh was arrested for speeding and drunk driving with a suspended license in 2008. Kavanaugh pled guilty to violating his probation and the other charges were dropped. Kavanaugh then began using a driver.

In 2013, Kavanaugh was criminally investigated for potentially impeding the manhunt for Christopher Dorner because Kavanaugh had landed his helicopter on a sheriff's helipad during the manhunt. Prior to the investigation, Kavanaugh had declined to support sheriff Lee Baca's bid for reelection, whose department launched the investigation. The investigation was heavily criticized by Kavanaugh and a spokesperson called it a "politically motivated vendetta". The investigation was later closed after it concluded that Kavanaugh had received prior permission to land on the helipad.

Recognition
Kavanaugh was named by Variety as 2011's "Showman of the Year" and placed 22nd on the Fortune 40 Under 40 list in 2011.

Selected filmography

Executive producer

Producer

References

External links

1974 births
Living people
American financiers
People from Brentwood, Los Angeles
University of California, Los Angeles alumni
American chief executives
Brentwood School (Los Angeles) alumni
American independent film production company founders
21st-century American Jews